Hasan Uddin Sarkar is a Bangladesh Nationalist Party politician and a former Jatiya Sangsad member representing the Gazipur-2 constituency.

Career
Sarkar was a labor leader in Tongi. He is a central member of Bangladesh Nationalist Party. He contested 1996 election in Tongi from the Jatiya Party. He was elected to Parliament from Tongi as a candidate of Bangladesh Nationalist Party.

References

1940s births
Living people
Jatiya Party politicians
Bangladesh Nationalist Party politicians
3rd Jatiya Sangsad members
4th Jatiya Sangsad members
Year of birth missing (living people)
Place of birth missing (living people)